The Nicolas-Beazley NB-8G is a United States two-seat parasol wing light monoplane that was constructed in the early 1930s.

Development

The NB-8G was designed and built by the Nicholas-Beazley Airplane Company at its factory in Marshall, Missouri. The first of 57 examples flew in 1931, and most are powered by the Armstrong-Siddeley Genet Mark II engine of  Some were later fitted with the  Lambert engine.

The aircraft has a high strut-mounted parasol wing that can be folded to reduce hangarage space required and to permit towing by road. The two crew seats are arranged side-by-side. Initially the cockpit was open, but some examples later had an enclosure fitted. Production ceased in 1935.

Operational history

The NB-8G was advertised for sale at $1,790. It was fully aerobatic. 57 examples were purchased, mainly by private pilot owners in the United States.

Six examples were still extant in 2009, with at least two being fully airworthy. Examples of these can be viewed at the Old Rhinebeck Aerodrome museum in New York State, and the Historic Aircraft Restoration Museum at Creve Coeur airfield near St Louis Missouri.

Specifications (NB-8G Genet-powered)

References
Notes

Bibliography

1930s United States civil utility aircraft
Parasol-wing aircraft
Single-engined tractor aircraft
Aircraft first flown in 1931